FC Energiya Volzhsky is an association football club from Volzhsky, Russia, founded in 1956. It plays in the Russian Amateur Football League. It spent several seasons in the Russian First Division in the 1990s. In the past, the team was called Torpedo Volzhsky (1976–1977 and 1980–2007) and Trud Volzhsky (1978–1979).

External links
Official website

 
Association football clubs established in 1956
Defunct football clubs in Russia
Sport in Volzhsky
1956 establishments in Russia